This is a listing of Australian rules footballers who made their debut with a club during the 2007 Australian Football League season.

References

Australian rules football records and statistics
Australian rules football-related lists
2007 in Australian rules football
2007 Australian Football League season